The 2011 Curl Mesabi Cash Spiel was held from December 16 to 18 at the Range Recreation and Civic Center in Eveleth, Minnesota, as part of the 2011–12 World Curling Tour. The purses for the men's and women's events were USD$17,200 and USD$10,000, respectively. The event was held in a round robin format.

Men

Teams

Round Robin standings

Playoffs

Women

Teams

Round Robin standings

Playoffs

External links

Curl Mesabi Cash Spiel
Curl Mesabi Cash Spiel
Curling in Minnesota